Portland Inlet is an inlet of the Pacific Ocean on the north coast of British Columbia, Canada, approximately  north of Prince Rupert. It joins Chatham Sound opposite the Dixon Entrance. It drains the Portland Canal, Nass Bay (outlet of the Nass River), and Khutzeymateen Inlet, among others, and is the site of Pearse Island and Somerville Island. Other major sidewaters of the inlet are Observatory Inlet and its east arm, Alice Arm.

Portland Inlet was mapped by the Vancouver Expedition in 1793 and named Brown Inlet, with George Vancouver later changing the name to honour the British House of Portland.

See also
Fjords of Canada

References

Fjords of British Columbia
North Coast of British Columbia
Inlets of British Columbia